Sredinom (trans. Through the middle) is the eight studio album of Bosnian musician Dino Merlin, his third as a solo artist. It was released in 2000 and is considered to be one of Dino Merlin's best work to date and helped establish Dino Merlin as one of the most prominent singers-songwriters in the region. Sredinom is one of the most commercially successful albums ever to be released in Southeast Europe with several million copies having been sold.

Track listing

External links
 at Dino Merlin's official web site

2000 albums
Dino Merlin albums